Emil A. Lingheim (1898–1984) was a Swedish film director and editor.

Selected filmography
 Secret Svensson (1933)
 Saturday Nights (1933)
 The Women Around Larsson (1934)
 Close Relations (1935)
 South of the Highway (1936)
 Raggen (1936)
 Baldwin's Wedding (1938)
 For Better, for Worse (1938)
 Sun Over Sweden (1938)
 Storm Over the Skerries (1938)
 Kalle's Inn (1939)
 Bashful Anton (1940)
 A Sailor on Horseback (1940)
 Sunny Sunberg (1941)
 Lasse-Maja (1941)
 Sun Over Klara (1942)
 The People of Hemsö (1944)
 Blizzard (1944)
 The Happy Tailor (1945)
 Tired Theodore (1945)
The Key and the Ring (1947)
 The Loveliest Thing on Earth (1947)
 Girl from the Mountain Village (1948)
 Pimpernel Svensson (1950)
 Count Svensson (1951)
 A Difficult Parish (1958)

References

Bibliography 
 Mariah Larsson & Anders Marklund. Swedish Film: An Introduction and Reader. Nordic Academic Press, 2010.

External links 
 

1898 births
1984 deaths
Swedish film directors
Swedish film editors